The Ryabushinsky Museum of Icons and Paintings is a private museum with a collection of more than 2,000 items, comprising Medieval West European paintings and encaustics. Since June 2013, the building was closed for reconstruction, the Museum itself did a cultural, educational and research activities. The Head of Museum is Gubina Nadezhda Vladimirovna.

The museum started from an exhibition in Amersfoort, Netherlands organised by Igor Vozyakov, a Russian entrepreneur and collector, maecenas, who donated to Ukraine an ancient icon "Protection of the Holy Virgin" (16th century). The museum opened in 2009 in Moscow with an exhibition entitled "Godlessness". It showed the early days of Communism and displaying photos of desecrated churches and slashed icons.

Collection
The collection includes portraits by Faum, and icons ranging from the fifteenth through twentieth centuries, covering iconography centers of Russia, Italy, Spain, Flemish Belgium and Flanders masters and cultural heritage pieces. It is the world's largest private icon museum.

See also 
The Private Museum of Russian Icon

References

Art museums and galleries in Moscow
Religious museums in Russia
Art museums established in 2009
2009 establishments in Russia